The Tennessee Volunteers women's track and field program represents the University of Tennessee in the sport of track and field.  The indoor and outdoor programs compete in Division I of the National Collegiate Athletic Association (NCAA) and the Southeastern Conference (SEC).  The Lady Vols host their home outdoor meets at the newly renovated Tom Black Track at LaPorte Stadium, located on the university's Knoxville, Tennessee campus. They formally held meets indoors at Stokely Athletic Center until the arenas demolition in 2012, but will soon have a new indoor track facility sometime in the 2020s. The team is led by current head coach Duane Ross who took over the program after the firing of Beth Alford-Sullivan in May 2022.

Along with all other UT women's sports teams, it used the nickname "Lady Volunteers" (or the short form "Lady Vols") until the 2015–16 school year, when the school dropped the "Lady" prefix from the nicknames of all women's teams except in basketball. In 2017 the university announced the return of the “Lady Volunteer” name.

Throughout the program's history, the Lady Vols have produced 23 NCAA Indoor Individual Champions, 14 NCAA Outdoor Individual Champions, won 8 conference titles, and 3 team national championships. While not as successful historically as the Tennessee men's program, the Lady Vols have appeared in 32 NCAA Indoor Championships (4th most in SEC) and 37 Outdoor Championships (3rd most in SEC). Additionally, the program has finished as national runner up 7 times in Indoor Track and 2 times in Outdoor Track, and produced 4 Olympic Medalists.

Head coaches
Source

Yearly Record
Source

Note: The 2020 season was canceled after the SEC Indoor Championships due to the Coronavirus Pandemic, the SEC Outdoor and both NCAA Championships were not held.

NCAA Individual Event Champions

The Lady Vols have claimed 23 NCAA Indoor individual titles, 14 NCAA Outdoor individual crowns, 13 AIAW individual champions, and 3 DGWS wins.

Conference Individual Event Champions

Through the end of the 2022 season, the Lady Vols have won a total of 76 SEC Indoor individual championships, and 110 SEC Outdoor individual titles.

Tennessee Lady Volunteer Olympians
Through the 2020 Summer Olympics, 18 current and former Lady Vols have represented 8 different nations in the Olympic Games. They have brought home a total of 8 medals, including 6 gold, 1 silver, and 1 bronze medal.

Medalists

Participants

See also 
Tennessee men's track and field
Tennessee women's cross country
Tennessee men's cross country

References 

Tennessee Volunteers track and field
College women's sports in the United States
Women's sports in Tennessee